Contemporary Bulgarian Writers is an online literary platform which presents to the English speaking audience profiles of living Bulgarian authors of fiction and short stories.

About the Idea 
Contemporary Bulgarian Writers aims at facilitating the access of the English speaking audience to the contemporary Bulgarian literature. Created in public interest, its mission is to be a crossing-point of the contemporary Bulgarian literature and the English speaking world.

About the Platform 
Each author’s profile contains a biography, an excerpt(s) and a picture. Synopses, interviews and critical reviews of the published excerpts are also available. The translators of the published texts are presented there as well.

Featured Writers 
Here is a list of the writers presented so far:
 Sekulov, Alexander
 Shpatov, Alexander
 Alexieva, Elena
 Andreev, Emil
 Boykov, Nikolay
 Damianov, Krassimir
 Damyanovska, Svetla
 Denchev, Petar
 Dimitrov, Ivan
 Dimitrova, Kristin
 Dimova, Theodora
 Doneva, Maria
 Fayon, Betti
 Dvoryanova, Emilia
 Evtimova, Zdravka
 Popov, Alek
 Slavchev, Dobromir
 Gospodinov, Georgi
 Zarev, Vladimir
 Ruskov, Milen
 Kanev, Peycho
 Karastoyanov, Hristo
 Nemchev, Vergil
 Nikiforov, Galin
 Radeva, Yanitsa
 Roshkev, Stoil
 Tenev, Georgi
 Terziyski, Kalin
 Zaharieva, Virginia
 Karabashliev, Zachary

Founder and Funders 
Contemporary Bulgarian Writers was created in 2010 by the Elizabeth Kostova Foundation. It is supported by the Bulgarian Ministry of Foreign Affairs’ Institute for Culture, the America for Bulgaria Foundation and the American Foundation for Bulgaria.

References

External links 
 Contemporary Bulgarian Writers
 Elizabeth Kostova Foundation
 Rochester University's Open Letter Books about the project